Opogona  flavofasciata is a moth of the family Tineidae. It is found in the India (Calcutta), Sri Lanka and the Philippines.

The forewings are dark purple, more greyish at the base, with a broad dark yellow fascia nearly in the middle, very nearly straight, but rather nearer the base on the inner margin than on the costa. The hindwings are coppery-brown, but paler at the base.

References

Moths described in 1859
Opogona